The following is a list of all current judges of the United States district and territorial courts. The list includes both "active" and "senior" judges, both of whom hear and decide cases. There are 89 districts in the 50 states, with a total of 94 districts including 4 territories and the District of Columbia. Each of the 50 states has between one and four Article III district courts, and the District of Columbia and Puerto Rico each have one Article III district court. Article III judges have lifetime tenure.

The insular areas of Guam, the Northern Mariana Islands, and the United States Virgin Islands each have one Article IV territorial court. These courts are called "district courts" and exercise the same jurisdiction as district courts; however, Article IV territorial courts differ from Article III district courts in that territorial courts have judges who serve ten-year terms rather than lifetime tenures.

As of 2021, Congress has authorized 677 district judgeships, including 667 permanent judgeships and 10 temporary judgeships, though the number of "current" judges will be higher than 677 because of some judges electing senior status. Only active, non-senior-status judges may fill one of the 677 authorized judgeships. In addition, a small number of judges are concurrently appointed to more than one judgeship. While some judges with senior status are currently inactive, these judges are not yet retired and may return to actively hearing cases at any time. As of November 12, 2021, there are 71 Article III district court vacancies with 26 nominations awaiting Senate action and no Article IV vacancies or nominees awaiting Senate action.

Middle District of Alabama

Northern District of Alabama

Southern District of Alabama

District of Alaska

District of Arizona

Eastern District of Arkansas

Western District of Arkansas

Central District of California

Eastern District of California

Northern District of California

Southern District of California

District of Colorado

District of Columbia

District of Connecticut

District of Delaware

Middle District of Florida

Northern District of Florida

Southern District of Florida

Middle District of Georgia

Northern District of Georgia

Southern District of Georgia

District Court of Guam

District of Hawaii

District of Idaho

Central District of Illinois

Northern District of Illinois

Southern District of Illinois

Northern District of Indiana

Southern District of Indiana

Northern District of Iowa

Southern District of Iowa

District of Kansas

Eastern District of Kentucky

Western District of Kentucky

Eastern District of Louisiana

Middle District of Louisiana

Western District of Louisiana

District of Maine

District of Maryland

District of Massachusetts

Eastern District of Michigan

Western District of Michigan

District of Minnesota

Northern District of Mississippi

Southern District of Mississippi

Eastern District of Missouri

Western District of Missouri

District of Montana

District of Nebraska

District of Nevada

District of New Hampshire

District of New Jersey

District of New Mexico

Eastern District of New York

Northern District of New York

Southern District of New York

Western District of New York

Eastern District of North Carolina

Middle District of North Carolina

Western District of North Carolina

District of North Dakota

District Court for the Northern Mariana Islands

Northern District of Ohio

Southern District of Ohio

Eastern District of Oklahoma

Northern District of Oklahoma

Western District of Oklahoma

District of Oregon

Eastern District of Pennsylvania

Middle District of Pennsylvania

Western District of Pennsylvania

District of Puerto Rico

District of Rhode Island

District of South Carolina

District of South Dakota

Eastern District of Tennessee

Middle District of Tennessee

Western District of Tennessee

Eastern District of Texas

Northern District of Texas

Southern District of Texas

Western District of Texas

District of Utah

District of Vermont

District Court of the Virgin Islands

Eastern District of Virginia

Western District of Virginia

Eastern District of Washington

Western District of Washington

Northern District of West Virginia

Southern District of West Virginia

Eastern District of Wisconsin

Western District of Wisconsin

District of Wyoming

See also
 List of current United States circuit judges

References 

Lists of United States district court judges
district judges